Do It Now! is a 1967 album by the organist Brother Jack McDuff which was his third release on the Atlantic label.

Reception

Scott Yanow in his review for AllMusic wrote, "McDuff and his regular group of the period swing their way through five of McDuff's originals and two obscurities with plenty of spirit, if not a great deal of originality."

Track listing 
All compositions by Jack McDuff except as indicated
 "Snap Back Jack" - 4:50 
 "Mush Melon"  - 4:44 
 "Summer Samba (Samba de Verão)" (Norman Gimbel, Marcos Valle, Paulo Sérgio Valle) - 5:10 
 "Do It Now" - 5:35 
 "Strolling Blues"  - 8:12   
 "Pleasant Moments" (Harold Ousley) - 6:29   
 "Mutt & Jeff" - 4:35 
Recorded in New York City on December 15, 1966 (tracks 2-5), December 20, 1966 (tracks 6 & 7) and May 23, 1967 (track 1).

Personnel 
Jack McDuff - organ
Danny Turner - alto saxophone, tenor saxophone, flute
Leo Johnson - tenor saxophone, flute
Melvin Sparks - guitar
Ray Appleton (tracks 2-7), Ray Lucas (track 1) - drums

References 

Jack McDuff albums
1967 albums
Atlantic Records albums